Thin Ice is a board game that was produced in 1989 by the Pressman Toy Corporation. It was invented by Denise Heimrich and licensed by Robert Fuhrer and Nextoy, LLC.  The game features a lower ring with marbles and an upper ring, where a tissue is placed to emulate thin ice. Marbles sit below in a pool of water. The object of the game is to place as many wet marbles as possible on the tissue with a pair of big plastic tweezers included with the game, in which the tweezers were covered by a sticker showing a happy Eskimo reaching out to "grab" one of the marbles. Eventually, the weight of the marbles will cause the tissue to break and dump the marbles into the lower ring. The player who placed the marble on the ring causing it to break would then have a "strike", and the upper ring would be reset with new tissue and the players would once again place marbles atop it. The first person to break through the "ice" 3 times is the loser.

A 1990 TV commercial for the game used the song Wipe Out adding lyrics such as "Place a marble on the ice, but watch out! You are on thin ice, you are on thin ice!"

External links

Board games introduced in 1989
Children's board games
Larry Harris (game designer) games
Pressman Toy Corporation games